Diphosphoglycerate may refer to:

 1,3-Diphosphoglycerate
 2,3-Diphosphoglycerate